During the 1964–65 season Hibernian, a football club based in Edinburgh, came fourth out of 18 clubs in the Scottish First Division.

Scottish First Division

Final League table

Scottish League Cup

Group stage

Group 2 final table

Scottish Cup

1964 Summer Cup

Continued from May

1965 Summer Cup

Section 4 Final Table

Knockout stage

See also
List of Hibernian F.C. seasons

References

External links
Hibernian 1964/1965 results and fixtures, Soccerbase

Hibernian F.C. seasons
Hibernian